Jim Copeland (born March 18, 1962) is an American former cyclist. He competed in the team time trial at the 1988 Summer Olympics.

References

External links
 

1962 births
Living people
American male cyclists
Olympic cyclists of the United States
Cyclists at the 1988 Summer Olympics
Sportspeople from Huntsville, Alabama